Cascade Communications was a Westford, Massachusetts based manufacturer of communications equipment.

Founding
Cascade was founded by Gururaj Deshpande in 1990, and was led by CEO Dan Smith, VP of Sales Mike Champa and CFO Paul Blondin.

Product
Cascade made a compact Frame Relay and Asynchronous Transfer Mode communication switches that were sold to telecommunication service providers worldwide.  Frame Relay service was the primary data service used by companies in the mid-1990s to create secure internal communication networks between separate sites, and Cascade's equipment carried an estimated 70% of the world's Internet traffic during this time.

Their most important direct competitor was StrataCom, which was acquired by Cisco Systems in 1996 for US $4B.

Acquisition
In 1997, Ascend Communications acquired Cascade Communications for US $3.7 Billion, to move into ATM and Frame Relay markets. Ascend was later acquired by Lucent Technologies in 1999 in one of the largest mergers in communications equipment history (US $24 Billion).  The Cascade portion of Ascend's business was more interesting to Lucent than the modem termination business that comprised the rest of Ascend.

The seed of startups
Both Desh Deshpande and CEO Dan Smith profited handsomely from the acquisition, as did hundreds of Cascade employees.  In addition, Cascade was notable for invigorating the telecommunications startup culture in Massachusetts in the mid 1990s.  Cascade alumni were founders or key contributors to many other financially successful Boston area telecom companies in the late 1990s.  Deshpande and Smith went on to found Sycamore Networks and VP of Sales Mike Champa went on to found Omnia Communications and later was the CEO of Winphoria Networks.

References

1997 mergers and acquisitions
American companies established in 1990
American companies disestablished in 1997
Companies based in Massachusetts
Computer companies established in 1990
Computer companies disestablished in 1997
Defunct computer companies of the United States
Defunct networking companies
Defunct companies based in Massachusetts